Theodor Gruber (unknown – unknown) was an Austrian chess player.

Biography
In 1921, Theodor Gruber took the 2nd place in the Vienna Amateur Chess Championship. In 1922, in Bad Oeynhausen he participated in German Chess Congress and shared 8th - 10th place. In 1923, in Vienna Theodor Gruber participated in first Carl Schlechter Memorial Tournament.  

Theodor Gruber played for Austria in the Chess Olympiad:
 In 1927, at reserve board in the 1st Chess Olympiad in London (+2, =7, -3).

References

External links

Theodor Gruber chess games at 365chess.com

Year of birth missing
Year of death missing
Austrian chess players
Chess Olympiad competitors